Piovera is a frazione of Alluvioni Piovera in the Province of Alessandria in the Italian region Piedmont, located about  east of Turin and about  northeast of Alessandria.

References

Cities and towns in Piedmont